Fresnaye is one of Cape Town's most affluent suburbs, situated between Signal Hill and Sea Point, a few kilometres to the west of Cape Town's Central Business District (CBD).

History
The original name was Winterslust, and the farmhouse was at that time, the only building on the mountain slopes, other than Heeren Huis near Bantry Bay, built in 1776. Fresnaye was set in vineyards and orchards, and referred to as "A Garden of Eden" at the time. 

The suburbs street names reflect its French heritage to this day.

Geography
Fresnaye is set on the slopes of Lion’s Head on the East and between Sea Point and Bantry Bay to the suburb's North West and South West respectively.

Notable residents 

 F. W. de Klerk (1936-2021), state president of South Africa from 1989 to 1994.

References

Suburbs of Cape Town